Lorenzo Paoli (born 17 February 1988 in Urbino) is an Italian footballer who plays as a midfielder for Serie D club Pineto.

Club career
Paoli signed his first professional footballing contract with Serie C2 club San Marino Calcio, and made his first appearance in a league match against Gubbio on 7 October 2007.

On 13 July 2020 he moved to Serie D club Pineto.

References

 Lorenzo Paoli's profile on San Marino Calcio's official website

1988 births
Living people
Italian footballers
A.S.D. Victor San Marino players
U.S. Ancona 1905 players
Serie C players
Association football midfielders